Buria may refer to:

 Buria, an Indian municipality in the Bhiwani district of Haryana
 Buria Baf, a village in Lorestan Province, Iran
 Buría, a civil parish in Simón Planas Municipality, Venezuela
 Miguel de Buría (c. 1510 – c. 1555), former slave who became King of Buría in Venezuela
 Buria (буря), the Russian word for "tempest", an official nickname for the second Buran-class spaceplane Ptichka.
 Buria (bryozoan), an extinct genus of cyclostome Bryozoan

See also
 Burias (disambiguation)
 Bureya (disambiguation)